Rainy River was a provincial electoral district in the Canadian province of Ontario, which returned one member to the Legislative Assembly of Ontario from 1908 to 1999.

The district was created in 1908 from part of the former district of Port Arthur and Rainy River, and comprised much of the Rainy River District. It remained in service until 1999, when it was merged into Kenora—Rainy River as part of the Mike Harris government's reforms of the provincial legislature, which reduced the number of electoral districts in the province from 130 to 103. For much of its history, it was the smallest electoral district in the entire province by population.

Members of Provincial Parliament

References

Former provincial electoral districts of Ontario